Animated political cartoons are the evolution of the editorial cartoon. The animated political cartoons are normally written in Flash.

Emergence 
With the dot com crash at the turn of the millennium, artists and animators were among the first to be let go at online news sites.  Early pioneers such as Pat Oliphant stopped adding content shortly after.
Others, however, have carved out a market for their trade.  JibJab is the most notable, making Internet history with their cartoon This Land! in 2004.  Mark Fiore's animations have appeared in SFGate for years, he appears to be the most successful animator, currently publishing his cartoons once a week. Zina Saunders creates regular animations for Mother Jones.

Examples
Innovative new cartoonists, such as J83 (independent), and Shujaat Ali from the Aljazeera news website, are also appearing and making inroads in this evolving medium. Australian 3d animated political cartoonist inspired by the team at India Today that produce the award winning 'So Sorry' animated political cartoons, TwoEyeHead has been one of the world's few dedicated and regular 3D animated political cartoonists since 2014. Used by many Australian news services the looping 3D cartoons, specifically developed for social media, have been viewed by millions and can be found at @twoeyehead on Twitter.  Peter Nicholson, of The Australian newspaper, publishes a new animation fortnightly, featuring the voices of mimic Paul Jennings. In Britain, Matthew Buck (Hack) launched the first regular animated political cartoon for Tribune magazine in May 2007 and subsequently started to work, weekly, for Channel 4 (News website). After the Channel 4  work ceased with the financial problems at ITN, his work - The Opinions of Tobias Grubbe  - reappeared at the Guardian during the UK General Election of 2010.

In 2010, Ray Griggs, a right-wing commercial producer released a preview of "I Want Your Money", a full-length feature film deriding President Obama's economic policy utilizing animated cartoon simulations of the President, Ronald Reagan, President and Mrs. Clinton and others.

Independent animators have also entered the animated political cartoon market such as HeadaState, which uses 3D software to create its animated shorts. Kyle Gordy's earthens.net provides unique animations that can be simultaneously provocative, satirical and funny.

See also

List of editorial cartoonists

References

External links 
Cartoon Magazine
Enemies Domestic
HeadaState
j83.com
Bruce Hammond
Walt Handelsman
nicholsoncartoons
Matt Buck (Hack)
Ted Rall

Editorial cartooning